Mass is a surname with either following meaning and origin:
North German and Dutch: from a short form of the personal name Thomas. Compare Maas, Mas.
Jewish (Ashkenazic): metonymic occupational name from German Mass 'measure', 'measurement'.

People surnamed Mass include:

Isaac Mass (born 1976), a Massachusetts politician
Lawrence D. Mass (born 1946), American physician and writer who wrote the first press reports on the disease AIDS
Wayne Mass (1946–2019), American football player
Wendy Mass (born 1967), author of young adult and children's books

Fictional characters include:
Miss Mass, in the Marvel Comics universe
Sayla Mass, in the Universal Century Gundam universe

References